Cooks Wharf is a hamlet in the parish of Cheddington, in Buckinghamshire, England.  It is located where the main road into Cheddington from Pitstone crosses the Grand Union Canal. At the 2011 census the population of the area was included in the civil parish of Marsworth.

Apples from the surrounding orchards were loaded onto the narrowboats here to travel down the canal to London.

References

Hamlets in Buckinghamshire